Allen Bowie Duckett (1775 – July 19, 1809) was a United States circuit judge of the United States Circuit Court of the District of Columbia.

Education and career

Born in 1775, in Prince George's County, Province of Maryland, British America, Duckett graduated from the College of New Jersey (now Princeton University) in 1790 and read law. He entered private practice in Prince George's County, Maryland. He was an assistant clerk for the Maryland House of Delegates from 1793 to 1795. He was a member of the Maryland House of Delegates from 1796 to 1800. He was a member of the Executive Council of the State of Maryland from 1801 to 1806.

Federal judicial service

Duckett was nominated by President Thomas Jefferson on February 28, 1806, to a seat on the United States Circuit Court for the District of Columbia vacated by Judge William Cranch. He was confirmed by the United States Senate on March 3, 1806, and received his commission on March 17, 1806. His service terminated on July 19, 1809, due to his death in Prince George's County.

References

Sources

Further reading
 Allen Bowie Duckett, O Say Can You See: Early Washington, D.C., Law & Family (accessed November 5, 2015) This person page networks the involvement of Allen Bowie Duckett in the legal records and proceedings of the Circuit Court for the District of Columbia during his three-year term as judge.

1775 births
1809 deaths
19th-century American judges
Members of the Maryland House of Delegates
Judges of the United States Circuit Court of the District of Columbia
United States federal judges appointed by Thomas Jefferson
United States federal judges admitted to the practice of law by reading law